is a Shinto shrine located in the city of Nagoya, central Japan.

External links 
 Homepage of Gokiso Hachiman-gū

Shinto shrines in Nagoya
Hachiman shrines